Janet J. McCoy (July 31, 1916 – August 4, 1995) was an American politician and businesswoman.

Born in Saginaw, Michigan, McCoy went to Wayne State University. During World War II, McCoy served in the Women's Army Corps as one of the first officer candidates. After the war, McCoy was in the radio, television broadcasting and tourism business in California. McCoy was involved in the Republican Party political campaigns of Richard Nixon and Ronald Reagan. McCoy served as the last High Commissioner of the Trust Territory of the Pacific Islands 1981–1986. After her term, the territories began their transition to independence. McCoy died in Scottsburg, Oregon in 1995.

Notes

1916 births
1995 deaths
20th-century American businesspeople
20th-century American businesswomen
American women in politics
Women's Army Corps soldiers
Businesspeople from California
California Republicans
High Commissioners of the Trust Territory of the Pacific Islands
Military personnel from Michigan
Politicians from Saginaw, Michigan
Wayne State University alumni
People from Scottsburg, Oregon